Kevin (Probably) Saves the World (stylized as Kevin ^Probably Saves the World) is an American  high-concept angelic-themed fantasy comedy-drama television series that was created and executive produced by Michele Fazekas & Tara Butters for ABC Studios. The series was greenlit on May 11, 2017, and aired on ABC as a Tuesday night entry during the 2017–18 television season. The series premiered on October 3, 2017. The show is set in Taylor, Texas. On May 11, 2018, ABC cancelled the series after one season.

Premise
Kevin, a down-on-his-luck man who survived a suicide attempt, moves in with his twin sister Amy, an engineer and professor at the local college, and Amy's teenage daughter Reese. Shortly after, he encounters a celestial being named Yvette; Yvette claims that God has tasked Kevin with saving the world, and sent Yvette to guide and protect him.

At first, Kevin was the only one who could see and hear Yvette, so his conversations appear to be hallucinations to those around him. Kevin must perform good deeds to build up his spiritual powers, forcing him to become a better person. The series also explores a mystery, as there are supposed to be 36 righteous souls in each generation, but for unknown reasons, Kevin is the only one known to be left.

The series ended with Kevin having located three other righteous souls, and in a surprise revelation, allowed Yvette to appear in front of Amy, as she was now called upon to help Kevin in their quest.

Cast and characters

Main
 Jason Ritter as Kevin Finn
 JoAnna Garcia as Amy Cabrera (née Finn)
 Kimberly Hebert Gregory as Yvette
 India de Beaufort as Kristin Allen
 J. August Richards as Sheriff Deputy Nathan Purcell
 Chloe East as Reese Cabrera
 Dustin Ybarra as Tyler Medina

Recurring/Guest
 Kathleen Wilhoite as Phoebe Powell
 Lauren Blumenfeld as Ava
 Marc Collins as Rory
 Lesley Boone as Lucille
 Will Sasso as Dave
 Abbey McBride as Becky Simpson
 Barbara Eve Harris as Colonel O'Donnell
 Michael Harney as Karl Gilmore
 Sam Huntington as Jake Gilmore
 Emma Bell as Deb
 Richard Masur as Dr. Sloane
 Kate Flannery as Anne
 Brandon Quinn as Ignacio "Iggy" DePerro
 Anjali Bhimani as Susan Allen
 David Huynh as Vong, whose newborn daughter is the first righteous soul to be located by Kevin
 Troy Evans as Gus
 Sprague Grayden as Shea, the second righteous soul located by Kevin
 Currie Graham as Barry, the third righteous soul located by Kevin
 Frank Nichols as Airport attendant

Episodes

Production
The series was originally called The Gospel of Kevin, but the name was changed since the show was not "overtly religious".

The series was picked up for a 16-episode full season on November 10, 2017.

On May 11, 2018, ABC canceled the show after one season.

Casting
Cristela Alonzo, who played a lead role as the heaven-sent entity in the original pilot, was replaced by Kimberly Hebert Gregory after the series was picked up.

Filming 
The series was filmed in and around Atlanta Georgia, as well as in Austin, Texas.
The pilot filmed March 23, 2017 in San Antonio, Texas at the San Antonio International Airport

Reception

Ratings

Critical response
The review aggregator website Rotten Tomatoes reported a 63% approval rating with an average rating of 6.73/10 based on 24 reviews. The website's consensus reads, "Breezily entertaining, Kevin (Probably) Saves the World relies on its likable lead to carry its still-sketchy premise, hinting at deeper potential that's yet to develop." Metacritic, which uses a weighted average, assigned a score of 59 out of 100 based on 18 critics, indicating "mixed or average reviews".

References

External links
 Official website
 

2010s American comedy-drama television series
2017 American television series debuts
2018 American television series endings
American Broadcasting Company original programming
American fantasy television series
Angels in television
Television series by ABC Studios
English-language television shows
Television shows set in Texas
American fantasy drama television series